Elizabeth Bennett is a British actress and television producer.

Bennett has appeared in several British television series, including The Sandbaggers, The Bill, The Lakes, Diana, Chef!, Dangerfield, The Duchess of Duke Street, Bergerac (Series 2 Episode 9, "The Moonlight Girls"), Down to Earth and The Last Detective. She is best known for her long recurring role as Joyce Jowett in the long-running ITV series Heartbeat, and previously played 'Enid Thompson' in the British situation comedy Home to Roost and then 'Enid Tompkins' in its US remake, You Again?.

Bennett also appeared in the television film Margaret (2009), and also played the small but important role of Miss Pennywinkle in the French language films Largo Winch and its sequel Largo Winch II, both based on the Belgian comic book series.

External links 
  

British actresses
Living people
Actresses from Yorkshire
Place of birth missing (living people)
Year of birth missing (living people)